Giovanni Steffè (8 March 1928 – 19 October 2016) was an Italian rower who competed in the 1948 Summer Olympics.

He was born in Trieste in 1928. In 1948 he was a crew member of the Italian boat which won the silver medal in the coxed pair event. He died on 19 October 2016.

References

External links
 Giovanni Steffé's profile at Worldrowing.com

1926 births
2016 deaths
Italian male rowers
Olympic rowers of Italy
Rowers at the 1948 Summer Olympics
Olympic silver medalists for Italy
Sportspeople from Trieste
Olympic medalists in rowing
Medalists at the 1948 Summer Olympics
European Rowing Championships medalists